Kırköy can refer to:

 Kırköy, Kale
 Kırköy, Kızılcahamam
 Kırköy, Posof
 Kırköy, Uğurludağ